The 1924 Temple Owls football team was an American football team that represented Temple University as an independent during the 1924 college football season. In its first and only season under head coach Albert Barron, the team compiled a 1–4 record.

Schedule

References

Temple
Temple Owls football seasons
Temple Owls football